In thermodynamics, the exergy of a system is the maximum useful work possible during a process that brings the system into equilibrium with a heat reservoir, reaching maximum entropy. When the surroundings are the reservoir, exergy is the potential of a system to cause a change as it achieves equilibrium with its environment.  Exergy is the energy that is available to be used. After the system and surroundings reach equilibrium, the exergy is zero.  Determining exergy was also the first goal of thermodynamics. The term "exergy" was coined in 1956 by Zoran Rant (1904–1972) by using the Greek ex and ergon meaning "from work", but the concept had been earlier developed by J Willard Gibbs (the namesake of Gibbs free energy) in 1873.

Energy is neither created nor destroyed during a process. Energy changes from one form to another (see First Law of Thermodynamics). In contrast, exergy is always destroyed when a process is irreversible, for example loss of heat to the environment (see Second Law of Thermodynamics). This destruction is proportional to the entropy increase of the system together with its surroundings (see Entropy production). The destroyed exergy has been called anergy. For an isentropic process, exergy and energy are interchangeable terms, and there is no anergy.

Definitions

Exergy is a combination property of a system and its environment because it depends on the state of both the system and environment.  The exergy of a system in equilibrium with the environment is zero. Exergy is neither a thermodynamic property of matter nor a thermodynamic potential of a system.  Exergy and energy both have units of joules. The internal energy of a system is always measured from a fixed reference state and is therefore always a state function.  Some authors define the exergy of the system to be changed when the environment changes, in which case it is not a state function.  Other writers prefer a slightly alternate definition of the available energy or exergy of a system where the environment is firmly defined,  as an unchangeable absolute reference state, and in this alternate definition, exergy becomes a property of the state of the system alone.

However, from a theoretical point of view, exergy may be defined without reference to any environment. If the intensive properties of different finitely extended elements of a system differ, there is always the possibility to extract mechanical work from the system.

For a heat engine, the exergy can be simply defined as the energy input times the Carnot efficiency. Since many systems can be modeled as a heat engine, this definition can be useful for many applications.

Terminology
The term exergy is also used, by analogy with its physical definition, in information theory related to reversible computing.  Exergy is also synonymous with: available energy, exergic energy, essergy (considered archaic), utilizable energy, available useful work, maximum (or minimum) work, maximum (or minimum) work content, reversible work, ideal work, availability or available work.

Implications
The exergy destruction of a cycle is the sum of the exergy destruction of the processes that compose that cycle. The exergy destruction of a cycle can also be determined without tracing the individual processes by considering the entire cycle as a single process and using one of the exergy destruction equations.

Examples
For two thermal reservoirs at temperatures TH and TC<TH, as considered by Carnot, the exergy is the work W that can be done by a reversible engine.  Specifically, with QH the heat provided by the hot reservoir, Carnot’s analysis gives W/QH=(TH-TC)/TH.  Exergy, however, is the maximum work not merely for reversible cycles, but for all cycles, and indeed for all thermodynamic processes.  This includes processes that are not cyclic and are not reversible.  

As an example, consider the non-cyclic process of expansion of an ideal gas.  For free expansion the energy and temperature do not change, so by energy conservation no work is done.  On the other hand, for expansion done against a wall that always matched the (varying) pressure of the expanding gas (so the wall develops negligible kinetic energy), with no heat transfer (adiabatic wall), then the maximum work would be done.  This corresponds to the exergy.  Thus, in terms of exergy Carnot considered the exergy for a two thermal reservoir cyclic process.  Just as the work done depends on the process, so the exergy depends on the process, reducing to Carnot’s result for Carnot’s case. 

W. Thomson (from 1892, Lord Kelvin), as early as 1849 was exercised by what he called “lost energy”, which appears to be the same as “destroyed energy” and what has been called “anergy”.  In 1874 he wrote that “lost energy” is the same as the energy dissipated by, e.g., friction, electrical conduction (electric field-driven charge diffusion), heat conduction (temperature-driven thermal diffusion), viscous processes (transverse momentum diffusion) and particle diffusion (ink in water).  On the other hand, Kelvin did not indicate how to compute the “lost energy”.  This awaited the 1931 and 1932 works of Onsager on irreversible processes.

Mathematical description

An application of the second law of thermodynamics

Exergy uses system boundaries in a way that is unfamiliar to many. We imagine the presence of a Carnot engine between the system and its reference environment even though this engine does not exist in the real world.  Its only purpose is to measure the results of a "what-if" scenario to represent the most efficient work interaction possible between the system and its surroundings.

If a real-world reference environment is chosen that behaves like an unlimited reservoir that remains unaltered by the system, then Carnot's speculation about the consequences of a system heading towards equilibrium with time is addressed by two equivalent mathematical statements. Let B, the exergy or available work, decrease with time, and Stotal, the entropy of the system and its reference environment enclosed together in a larger isolated system, increase with time:

For macroscopic systems (above the thermodynamic limit), these statements are both expressions of the second law of thermodynamics if the following expression is used for exergy:

where the extensive quantities for the system are: U = Internal energy, V = Volume, and Ni = Moles of component i

The intensive quantities for the surroundings are: PR = Pressure, TR = temperature, μi, R = Chemical potential of component i

Individual terms also often have names attached to them:  is called "available PV work",  is called "entropic loss" or "heat loss" and the final term is called "available chemical energy."

Other thermodynamic potentials may be used to replace internal energy so long as proper care is taken in recognizing which natural variables correspond to which potential. For the recommended nomenclature of these potentials, see (Alberty, 2001). Equation is useful for processes where system volume, entropy, and the number of moles of various components change because internal energy is also a function of these variables and no others.

An alternative definition of internal energy does not separate available chemical potential from U. This expression is useful (when substituted into equation) for processes where system volume and entropy change, but no chemical reaction occurs:

In this case, a given set of chemicals at a given entropy and volume will have a single numerical value for this thermodynamic potential. A multi-state system may complicate or simplify the problem because the Gibbs phase rule predicts that intensive quantities will no longer be completely independent from each other.

A historical and cultural tangent
In 1848, William Thomson, 1st Baron Kelvin, asked (and immediately answered) the question

Is there any principle on which an absolute thermometric scale can be founded? It appears to me that Carnot’s theory of the motive power of heat enables us to give an affirmative answer.

With the benefit of the hindsight contained in equation, we are able to understand the historical impact of Kelvin's idea on physics.  Kelvin suggested that the best temperature scale would describe a constant ability for a unit of temperature in the surroundings to alter the available work from Carnot's engine. From equation:

Rudolf Clausius recognized the presence of a proportionality constant in Kelvin's analysis and gave it the name entropy in 1865 from the Greek for "transformation" because it describes the quantity of energy lost during the transformation from heat to work.  The available work from a Carnot engine is at its maximum when the surroundings are at a temperature of absolute zero.

Physicists then, as now, often look at a property with the word "available" or "utilizable" in its name with a certain unease.  The idea of what is available raises the question of "available to what?" and raises a concern about whether such a property is anthropocentric. Laws derived using such a property may not describe the universe but instead, describe what people wish to see.

The field of statistical mechanics (beginning with the work of Ludwig Boltzmann in developing the Boltzmann equation) relieved many physicists of this concern.  From this discipline, we now know that macroscopic properties may all be determined from properties on a microscopic scale where entropy is more "real" than temperature itself (see Thermodynamic temperature). Microscopic kinetic fluctuations among particles cause entropic loss, and this energy is unavailable for work because these fluctuations occur randomly in all directions.  The anthropocentric act is taken, in the eyes of some physicists and engineers today, when someone draws a hypothetical boundary, in fact, he says: "This is my system. What occurs beyond it is surroundings." In this context, exergy is sometimes described as an anthropocentric property, both by those who use it and those who don't.  Entropy is viewed as a more fundamental property of matter.

A potential for every thermodynamic situation
For a given set of chemicals at a given entropy and pressure, enthalpy H is used in the expression:

For a given set of chemicals at a given temperature and volume, Helmholtz free energy A is used in the expression:

For a given set of chemicals at a given temperature and pressure, Gibbs free energy G is used in the expression:

The potentials A and G are utilized for a constant temperature process.  In these cases, all energy is free to perform useful work because there is no entropic loss.  A chemical reaction that generates electricity with no associated change in temperature will also experience no entropic loss. (See Fuel cell.)  This is true of every isothermal process. Examples are gravitational potential energy, kinetic energy (on a macroscopic scale), solar energy, electrical energy, and many others. If friction, absorption, electrical resistance or a similar energy conversion takes place that releases heat, the impact of that heat on thermodynamic potentials must be considered, and it is this impact that decreases the available energy.

Chemical exergy
Similar to thermomechanical exergy, chemical exergy depends on the temperature and pressure of a system as well as on the composition. The key difference in evaluating chemical exergy versus thermomechanical exergy is that thermomechanical exergy does not take into account the difference in a system and the environment's chemical composition. If the temperature, pressure or composition of a system differs from the environment's state, then the overall system will have exergy.

The definition of chemical exergy resembles the standard definition of thermomechanical exergy, but with a few differences. Chemical exergy is defined as the maximum work that can be obtained when the considered system is brought into reaction with reference substances present in the environment. Defining the exergy reference environment is one of the most vital parts of analyzing chemical exergy. In general, the environment is defined as the composition of air at 25 °C and 1 atm of pressure. At these properties air consists of N2=75.67%, O2=20.35%, H2O(g)=3.12%, CO2=0.03% and other gases=0.83%. These molar fractions will become of use when applying Equation 8 below.

CaHbOc is the substance that is entering a system that one wants to find the maximum theoretical work of. By using the following equations, one can calculate the chemical exergy of the substance in a given system. Below, Equation 8 uses the Gibbs function of the applicable element or compound to calculate the chemical exergy. Equation 9 is similar but uses standard molar chemical exergy, which scientists have determined based on several criteria, including the ambient temperature and pressure that a system is being analyzed and the concentration of the most common components. These values can be found in thermodynamic books or in online tables.

Important equations

where:
 is the Gibbs function of the specific substance in the system at
. ( refers to the substance that is entering the system)
 is the Universal gas constant (8.314462 J/mol•K)
 is the temperature that the system is being evaluated at in absolute temperature
 is the molar fraction of the given substance in the environment, i.e. air

where  is the standard molar chemical exergy taken from a table for the specific conditions that the system is being evaluated.

Equation 9 is more commonly used due to the simplicity of only having to look up the standard chemical exergy for given substances. Using a standard table works well for most cases, even if the environmental conditions vary slightly, the difference is most likely negligible.

Total exergy
After finding the chemical exergy in a given system, one can find the total exergy by adding it to the thermomechanical exergy. Depending on the situation, the amount of chemical exergy added can be very small. If the system being evaluated involves combustion, the amount of chemical exergy is very large and necessary to find the total exergy of the system.

Irreversibility
Irreversibility accounts for the amount of exergy destroyed in a closed system, or in other words, the wasted work potential. This is also called dissipated energy. For highly efficient systems, the value of I, is low, and vice versa. The equation to calculate the irreversibility of a closed system, as it relates to the exergy of that system, is as follows:

where:  is the entropy generated by the system processes.

If  then there are irreversibilities present in the system.
If  then there are no irreversibilities present in the system.

The value of I, the irreversibility, can not be negative, as it is not a property. On the contrary, the availability is a different story, which is a property of the system.

Exergy analysis is based on the relation between the actual work and the maximal work, that could be obtained in the reversible process:

The first term at the right part is related to the difference in exergy at inlet and outlet of the system:

For an Isolated System:

No heat or work interactions with the surroundings occur, and therefore, there are no transfers of availability between the system and its surroundings. The change in exergy of an isolated system is equivalent, but opposite the value for the irreversibility of that system.

Applications
Applying equation to a subsystem yields:

This expression applies equally well for theoretical ideals in a wide variety of applications: electrolysis (decrease in G), galvanic cells and fuel cells (increase in G), explosives (increase in A), heating and refrigeration (exchange of H), motors (decrease in U) and generators (increase in U).

Utilization of the exergy concept often requires careful consideration of the choice of reference environment because, as Carnot knew, unlimited reservoirs do not exist in the real world.  A system may be maintained at a constant temperature to simulate an unlimited reservoir in the lab or in a factory, but those systems cannot then be isolated from a larger surrounding environment. However, with a proper choice of system boundaries, a reasonable constant reservoir can be imagined. A process sometimes must be compared to "the most realistic impossibility," and this invariably involves a certain amount of guesswork.

Engineering applications

One goal of energy and exergy methods in engineering is to compute what comes into and out of several possible designs before a design is built. Energy input and output will always balance according to the First Law of Thermodynamics or the energy conservation principle. Exergy output will not equal the exergy input for real processes since a part of the exergy input is always destroyed according to the Second Law of Thermodynamics for real processes. After the input and output are calculated, an engineer will often want to select the most efficient process. An energy efficiency or first law efficiency will determine the most efficient process based on wasting as little energy as possible relative to energy inputs.  An exergy efficiency or second-law efficiency will determine the most efficient process based on wasting and destroying as little available work as possible from a given input of available work. 

Exergy has been applied in a number of design applications in order to optimize systems or identify components or subsystems with the greatest potential for improvement. For instance, an exergy analysis of environmental control systems on the international space station revealed the oxygen generation assembly as the subsystem which destroyed the most exergy. 

Exergy is particularly useful for broad engineering analyses with many systems of varied nature, since it can account for mechanical, electrical, nuclear, chemical, or thermal systems. For this reason, Exergy analysis has also been used to optimize the performance of rocket vehicles. Exergy analysis affords a more detailed analysis compared to energy analysis because it also considers the relationship between the system and its environment. For example, exergy analysis has been used to compare possible power generation and storage systems on the moon, since exergy analysis considers both the system and its relationship with its environment. 

Application of exergy to unit operations in chemical plants was partially responsible for the huge growth of the chemical industry during the 20th century. 

As a simple example of exergy, air at atmospheric conditions of temperature, pressure, and composition contains energy but no exergy when it is chosen as the thermodynamic reference state known as ambient. Individual processes on Earth such as combustion in a power plant often eventually result in products that are incorporated into the atmosphere, so defining this reference state for exergy is useful even though the atmosphere itself is not at equilibrium and is full of long and short term variations.

If standard ambient conditions are used for calculations during chemical plant operation when the actual weather is very cold or hot, then certain parts of a chemical plant might seem to have an exergy efficiency of greater than 100%. Without taking into account the non-standard atmospheric temperature variation, these calculations can give an impression of being a perpetual motion machine.  Using actual conditions will give actual values, but standard ambient conditions are useful for initial design calculations.

Applications in natural resource utilization
In recent decades, utilization of exergy has spread outside of physics and engineering to the fields of industrial ecology, ecological economics, systems ecology, and energetics.  Defining where one field ends and the next begins is a matter of semantics, but applications of exergy can be placed into rigid categories.

Researchers in ecological economics and environmental accounting perform exergy-cost analyses in order to evaluate the impact of human activity on the current natural environment.  As with ambient air, this often requires the unrealistic substitution of properties from a natural environment in place of the reference state environment of Carnot.  For example, ecologists and others have developed reference conditions for the ocean and for the Earth's crust.  Exergy values for human activity using this information can be useful for comparing policy alternatives based on the efficiency of utilizing natural resources to perform work. Typical questions that may be answered are:

Does the human production of one unit of an economic good by method A utilize more of a resource's exergy than by method B?

Does the human production of economic good A utilize more of a resource's exergy than the production of good B?

Does the human production of economic good A utilize a resource's exergy more efficiently than the production of good B?

There has been some progress in standardizing and applying these methods.

Measuring exergy requires the evaluation of a system's reference state environment. With respect to the applications of exergy on natural resource utilization, the process of quantifying a system requires the assignment of value (both utilized and potential) to resources that are not always easily dissected into typical cost-benefit terms. However, to fully realize the potential of a system to do work, it is becoming increasingly imperative to understand exergetic potential of natural resources, and how human interference alters this potential.

Referencing the inherent qualities of a system in place of a reference state environment is the most direct way that ecologists determine the exergy of a natural resource. Specifically, it is easiest to examine the thermodynamic properties of a system, and the reference substances that are acceptable within the reference environment. This determination allows for the assumption of qualities in a natural state: deviation from these levels may indicate a change in the environment caused by outside sources. There are three kinds of reference substances that are acceptable, due to their proliferation on the planet: gases within the atmosphere, solids within the Earth's crust, and molecules or ions in seawater. By understanding these basic models, it's possible to determine the exergy of multiple earth systems interacting, like the effects of solar radiation on plant life. These basic categories are utilized as the main components of a reference environment when examining how exergy can be defined through natural resources.

Other qualities within a reference state environment include temperature, pressure, and any number of combinations of substances within a defined area. Again, the exergy of a system is determined by the potential of that system to do work, so it is necessary to determine the baseline qualities of a system before it is possible to understand the potential of that system. The thermodynamic value of a resource can be found by multiplying the exergy of the resource by the cost of obtaining the resource and processing it.

Today, it is becoming increasingly popular to analyze the environmental impacts of natural resource utilization, especially for energy usage. To understand the ramifications of these practices, exergy is utilized as a tool for determining the impact potential of emissions, fuels, and other sources of energy. Combustion of fossil fuels, for example, is examined with respect to assessing the environmental impacts of burning coal, oil, and natural gas. The current methods for analyzing the emissions from these three products can be compared to the process of determining the exergy of the systems affected; specifically, it is useful to examine these with regard to the reference state environment of gases within the atmosphere. In this way, it is easier to determine how human action is affecting the natural environment.

Applications in sustainability

In systems ecology, researchers sometimes consider the exergy of the current formation of natural resources from a small number of exergy inputs (usually solar radiation, tidal forces, and geothermal heat).  This application not only requires assumptions about reference states, but it also requires assumptions about the real environments of the past that might have been close to those reference states.  Can we decide which is the most "realistic impossibility" over such a long period of time when we are only speculating about the reality?

For instance, comparing oil exergy to coal exergy using a common reference state would require geothermal exergy inputs to describe the transition from biological material to fossil fuels during millions of years in the Earth's crust, and solar radiation exergy inputs to describe the material's history before then when it was part of the biosphere.  This would need to be carried out mathematically backwards through time, to a presumed era when the oil and coal could be assumed to be receiving the same exergy inputs from these sources.  A speculation about a past environment is different from assigning a reference state with respect to known environments today. Reasonable guesses about real ancient environments may be made, but they are untestable guesses, and so some regard this application as pseudoscience or pseudo-engineering.

The field describes this accumulated exergy in a natural resource over time as embodied energy with units of the "embodied joule" or "emjoule".

The important application of this research is to address sustainability issues in a quantitative fashion through a sustainability measurement:

Does the human production of an economic good deplete the exergy of Earth's natural resources more quickly than those resources are able to receive exergy?

If so, how does this compare to the depletion caused by producing the same good (or a different one) using a different set of natural resources?

Assigning one thermodynamically obtained value to an economic good

A technique proposed by systems ecologists is to consolidate the three exergy inputs described in the last section into the single exergy input of solar radiation, and to express the total input of exergy into an economic good as a solar embodied joule or sej. (See Emergy) Exergy inputs from solar, tidal, and geothermal forces all at one time had their origins at the beginning of the solar system under conditions which could be chosen as an initial reference state, and other speculative reference states could in theory be traced back to that time. With this tool we would be able to answer:

What fraction of the total human depletion of the Earth's exergy is caused by the production of a particular economic good?

What fraction of the total human and non-human depletion of the Earth's exergy is caused by the production of a particular economic good?

No additional thermodynamic laws are required for this idea, and the principles of energetics may confuse many issues for those outside the field.  The combination of untestable hypotheses, unfamiliar jargon that contradicts accepted jargon, intense advocacy among its supporters, and some degree of isolation from other disciplines have contributed to this protoscience being regarded by many as a pseudoscience.  However, its basic tenets are only a further utilization of the exergy concept.

Implications in the development of complex physical systems

A common hypothesis in systems ecology is that the design engineer's observation that a greater capital investment is needed to create a process with increased exergy efficiency is actually the economic result of a fundamental law of nature.  By this view, exergy is the analogue of economic currency in the natural world. The analogy to capital investment is the accumulation of exergy into a system over long periods of time resulting in embodied energy.  The analogy of capital investment resulting in a factory with high exergy efficiency is an increase in natural organizational structures with high exergy efficiency.  (See Maximum power).  Researchers in these fields describe biological evolution in terms of increases in organism complexity due to the requirement for increased exergy efficiency because of competition for limited sources of exergy.

Some biologists have a similar hypothesis.  A biological system (or a chemical plant) with a number of intermediate compartments and intermediate reactions is more efficient because the process is divided up into many small substeps, and this is closer to the reversible ideal of an infinite number of infinitesimal substeps.  Of course, an excessively large number of intermediate compartments comes at a capital cost that may be too high.

Testing this idea in living organisms or ecosystems is impossible for all practical purposes because of the large time scales and small exergy inputs involved for changes to take place. However, if this idea is correct, it would not be a new fundamental law of nature. It would simply be living systems and ecosystems maximizing their exergy efficiency by utilizing laws of thermodynamics developed in the 19th century.

Philosophical and cosmological implications

Some proponents of utilizing exergy concepts describe them as a biocentric or ecocentric alternative for terms like quality and value. The "deep ecology" movement views economic usage of these terms as an anthropocentric philosophy which should be discarded.  A possible universal thermodynamic concept of value or utility appeals to those with an interest in monism.

For some, the result of this line of thinking about tracking exergy into the deep past is a restatement of the cosmological argument that the universe was once at equilibrium and an input of exergy from some First Cause created a universe full of available work.  Current science is unable to describe the first 10−43 seconds of the universe (See Timeline of the Big Bang).  An external reference state is not able to be defined for such an event, and (regardless of its merits), such an argument may be better expressed in terms of entropy.

Quality of energy types
The ratio of exergy to energy in a substance can be considered a measure of energy quality.  Forms of energy such as macroscopic kinetic energy, electrical energy, and chemical Gibbs free energy are 100% recoverable as work, and therefore have exergy equal to their energy.  However, forms of energy such as radiation and thermal energy can not be converted completely to work, and have exergy content less than their energy content.  The exact proportion of exergy in a substance depends on the amount of entropy relative to the surrounding environment as determined by the Second Law of Thermodynamics.

Exergy is useful when measuring the efficiency of an energy conversion process.  The exergetic, or 2nd Law, efficiency is a ratio of the exergy output divided by the exergy input.  This formulation takes into account the quality of the energy, often offering a more accurate and useful analysis than efficiency estimates only using the First Law of Thermodynamics.

Work can be extracted also from bodies colder than the surroundings. When the flow of energy is coming into the body, work is performed by this energy obtained from the large reservoir, the surrounding. A quantitative treatment of the notion of energy quality rests on the definition of energy. According to the standard definition, Energy is a measure of the ability to do work. Work can involve the movement of a mass by a force that results from a transformation of energy. If there is an energy transformation, the second principle of energy flow transformations says that this process must involve the dissipation of some energy as heat. Measuring the amount of heat released is one way of quantifying the energy, or ability to do work and apply a force over a distance.

Exergy of heat available at a temperature

Maximal possible conversion of heat to work, or exergy content of heat, depends on the temperature at which heat is available and the temperature level at which the reject heat can be disposed, that is the temperature of the surrounding. The upper limit for conversion is known as Carnot efficiency and was discovered by Nicolas Léonard Sadi Carnot in 1824. See also Carnot heat engine.

Carnot efficiency is

where TH is the higher temperature and TC is the lower temperature, both as absolute temperature. From Equation 15 it is clear that in order to maximize efficiency one should maximize TH and minimize TC.

Exergy exchanged is then:

where Tsource is the temperature of the heat source, and To is the temperature of the surrounding.

Connection with economic value 

Exergy in a sense can be understood as a measure of the value of energy. Since high-exergy energy carriers can be used for more versatile purposes, due to their ability to do more work, they can be postulated to hold more economic value. This can be seen in the prices of energy carriers, i.e. high-exergy energy carriers such as electricity tend to be more valuable than low-exergy ones such as various fuels or heat. This has led to the substitution of more valuable high-exergy energy carriers with low-exergy energy carriers, when possible. An example is heating systems, where higher investment to heating systems allows using low-exergy energy sources. Thus high-exergy content is being substituted with capital investments.

Exergy based Life Cycle Assessment (LCA) 
Exergy of a system is the maximum useful work possible during a process that brings the system into equilibrium with a heat reservoir. Wall clearly states the relation between exergy analysis and resource accounting. This intuition confirmed by Dewulf Sciubba lead to exergo-economic accounting and to methods specifically dedicated to LCA such as exergetic material input per unit of service (EMIPS). The
concept of material input per unit of service (MIPS) is quantified in terms of the second law of thermodynamics, allowing the calculation of both resource input and service output in exergy terms. This exergetic material input per unit of service (EMIPS) has been elaborated for transport technology. The service not only takes into account the total mass to be transported
and the total distance, but also the mass per single transport and the delivery time. The applicability of the EMIPS methodology relates specifically to the transport system and allows an effective coupling with life cycle assessment. The exergy analysis according to EMIPS allowed the definition of a precise strategy for reducing environmental impacts of transport toward more sustainable transport. Such a strategy requires the reduction of the weight of vehicles, sustainable styles of driving, reducing the friction of tires, encouraging electric and hybrid vehicles, improving the walking and cycling environment in cities, and by enhancing the role of public transport, especially electric rail.

History

Carnot
In 1824, Sadi Carnot studied the improvements developed for steam engines by James Watt and others. Carnot utilized a purely theoretical perspective for these engines and developed new ideas. He wrote:

The question has often been raised whether the motive power of heat is unbounded, whether the possible improvements in steam engines have an assignable limit—a limit by which the nature of things will not allow to be passed by any means whatever... In order to consider in the most general way the principle of the production of motion by heat, it must be considered independently of any mechanism or any particular agent. It is necessary to establish principles applicable not only to steam-engines but to all imaginable heat-engines... The production of motion in steam-engines is always accompanied by a circumstance on which we should fix our attention.  This circumstance is the re-establishing of equilibrium… Imagine two bodies A and B, kept each at a constant temperature, that of A being higher than that of B. These two bodies, to which we can give or from which we can remove the heat without causing their temperatures to vary, exercise the functions of two unlimited reservoirs...

Carnot next described what is now called the Carnot engine, and proved by a thought experiment that any heat engine performing better than this engine would be a perpetual motion machine. Even in the 1820s, there was a long history of science forbidding such devices.  According to Carnot, "Such a creation is entirely contrary to ideas now accepted, to the laws of mechanics and of sound physics. It is inadmissible."

This description of an upper bound to the work that may be done by an engine was the earliest modern formulation of the second law of thermodynamics.  Because it involves no mathematics, it still often serves as the entry point for a modern understanding of both the second law and entropy.  Carnot's focus on heat engines, equilibrium, and heat reservoirs is also the best entry point for understanding the closely related concept of exergy.

Carnot believed in the incorrect caloric theory of heat that was popular during his time, but his thought experiment nevertheless described a fundamental limit of nature. As kinetic theory replaced caloric theory through the early and mid-19th century (see Timeline of thermodynamics), several scientists added mathematical precision to the first and second laws of thermodynamics and developed the concept of entropy.  Carnot's focus on processes at the human scale (above the thermodynamic limit) led to the most universally applicable concepts in physics.  Entropy and the second-law are applied today in fields ranging from quantum mechanics to physical cosmology.

Gibbs
In the 1870s, Josiah Willard Gibbs unified a large quantity of 19th century thermochemistry into one compact theory.  Gibbs's theory incorporated the new concept of a chemical potential to cause change when distant from a chemical equilibrium into the older work begun by Carnot in describing thermal and mechanical equilibrium and their potentials for change.  Gibbs's unifying theory resulted in the thermodynamic potential state functions describing differences from thermodynamic equilibrium.

In 1873, Gibbs derived the mathematics of "available energy of the body and medium" into the form it has today. (See the equations above).  The physics describing exergy has changed little since that time.

Helmholtz 
In the 1880s, German scientist Herman Von Helmholtz derived the equation for the maximum work which can be reversibly obtained from a closed system.

Rant 
In 1956, Yugoslav scholar Zoran Rant proposed the concept of Exergy, extending Gibbs and Helmholtz' work. Since then, continuous development in exergy analysis has seen many applications in thermodynamics, and exergy has been accepted as the maximum theoretical useful work which can be obtained from a system with respect to its environment.

See also

 Thermodynamic free energy
 Entropy production
 Energy: world resources and consumption
 Emergy

Notes

References

Further reading

Stephen Jay Kline (1999). The Low-Down on Entropy and Interpretive Thermodynamics, La Cañada, CA: DCW Industries. .

External links
Energy, Incorporating Exergy, An International Journal
An Annotated Bibliography of Exergy/Availability
Exergy – a useful concept by Göran Wall
Exergetics textbook for self-study by Göran Wall
Exergy by Isidoro Martinez
Exergy calculator by The Exergoecology Portal
Global Exergy Resource Chart
Guidebook to IEA ECBCS Annex 37, Low Exergy Systems for Heating and Cooling of Buildings
Introduction to the Concept of Exergy

Thermodynamic free energy
State functions
Ecological economics